The CPA Council of India (CPA India) is a constituent unit of the ICFAI University established for the development and regulation of the CPA profession on sound ethical lines. All students who successfully complete the CPA Program are eligible to become members of the CPA Council and are required to adhere to the Code of Ethics and Standards of Professional Conduct, as prescribed by the CPA Council from time to time. The Code of Conduct covers, inter alia, the following aspects:
 Integrity: A CPA shall conduct himself* with integrity and dignity in his dealings with the public, clients, customers, employers, employees, professionals and fellow analysts.
 Ethical Behavior: A CPA shall conduct himself and shall encourage others to practice the financial analysis profession in a professional and ethical manner that will reflect credit on himself and his profession and his organization/employer where or for whom he is working.
 Professional Competence: A CPA shall act with competence and shall strive to maintain and improve his competence and that of others in the profession.
 Objectivity: A CPA shall be fair in his dealings and must not be biased or prejudiced. He shall try to maintain objectivity and impartiality towards one and all.
 Professional Independence: A CPA shall use proper care and exercise independent professional judgement in all his professional activities.
 Public Trust: A CPA shall assume the basic responsibility to place the interest of clients, prospective clients and employers ahead of his own. He shall seek to enhance public confidence in his profession.

Membership
The 'Certified Public Accountant' designation will be conferred only on completion of MPA (Master in Professional Accounting) post graduate program offered by the ICFAI University. The CPA program offered by the ICFAI University, Tripura is a unique program covering the areas of accounting, auditing, taxation, laws & regulations, and allied areas.

The CPA program has been developed in the context of the present and future needs.

The core body of knowledge of the CPA Program includes current and evolving concepts, techniques and applications, and also providing the flavor of the frontiers of knowledge.

Objectives
The CPA program is a postgraduate program with the following broad concepts
 To encourage aspiring students equip themselves with the latest tools and techniques in accounting.
 To develop contemporary body of knowledge and skill-set and make them available for those seeking careers in professional accounting.
 To provide interdisciplinary insights into accounting, auditing, taxation and laws & regulations for developing holistic perspectives.
 To deepen insights into practical applications of accounting in a dynamic business environment.

The Approach
The CPA program follows the following distinctive but inter-related approaches :

 Basic knowledge aimed at improving students' understanding of certain fundamental phenomena and relationships underlying the changing world of accounting.
 Tools and techniques are required to equip students improve their analytical ability and power of integration and synthesis.
 Application areas linking the theoretical studies to the practical problems faced by professional accountants.
 Professional ethics aimed at inculcating in the students an ethical approach in their professional interactions and a sense of personal, corporate, and social responsibilities.

Focus Areas
The program has five focus areas:

 Accounting: The program covers the modern accounting practices and skills that are required in today's complex business environment. This enables business to take economic decisions and plan their activities effectively. It also helps professional accountants to be forward-looking, shifting their priorities from analyzing past events to acting as strategic partners, advisors and information providers.
 Auditing: The recent thrust on corporate governance and the adoption of computers by enterprises have not only revolutionized accounting practices but also impacted an auditor's ability to perform effectively. This program imparts the necessary knowledge and skills required in performing the audit function effectively in this changed environment.
 Taxation: The program is designed to update the student on the tax treatment of business entities. The various tax laws and tax planning considerations are dealt in detail.
 Laws and Regulations: The understanding of finer aspects of business laws and judicial precedents help managing business situations better in today's environment of liberalization and globalization. The program provides an understanding of the business laws and also the Indian and global regulatory environment.
 Allied Areas: The allied areas include management accounting, financial management and electives like accounting standards, forensic accounting, management control systems and business analysis and valuation.

See also
 CFA Council of India

References

External links
 CPA Council of India

Accounting in India
Professional associations based in India
Educational organisations based in India
India